James Cooke Brown (July 21, 1921 – February 13, 2000) was an American sociologist and science fiction author. He is notable for creating the artificial language Loglan and for designing the Parker Brothers board game Careers.

Brown's novel The Troika Incident (Doubleday, 1970) describes a worldwide free knowledge base similar to the Internet.  The novel begins with the belief that the world is on the eve of self-destruction, but then it presents a world about a century from now which is a paradise of peace and prosperity, all based on ideas, movements, and knowledge presently available in the world.  In its metafictional structure, the novel is a call for social change, not through revolution but through free education and the resilience of human ingenuity.  Long out of print and relatively rare, an e-book version (Amazon Kindle) of the novel was released in 2012.  The novel envisioned all books and periodicals being viewed on portable electronic devices called "readers" in the year 2070, when it is set.

Among his other achievements, Brown designed, and had built, a three-hulled sailboat, called a trimaran.  He utilized this boat to sail to many parts of the world.

While on a South American cruise with his wife, Brown was admitted to a hospital in Argentina, where he died at the age of 78.

Bibliography

Science Fiction
"The Emissary", Astounding Science Fiction
The Love Machine, Fantastic Universe
The Troika Incident: A Tetralogue In Two Parts, Doubleday, 1970

Sociology
Cooperative group formation: a problem in social engineering, University of Minnesota, 1951
The Job Market of the Future: Using Computers to Humanize Economies, James Cooke Brown, M.E. Sharpe, 2001,  
Paternity, Jokes and Song : A Possible Evolutionary Scenario for the Origin of Mind and Language, Brown J. C.; Greenhood W., 1983, vol. 8, no2, pp. 7–53 (5 p.), Journal of Social and Biological Structures, ISSN 0748-772X

Loglan
Loglan 1: a logical language, James Cooke Brown, Loglan Institute, 1975
Loglan 2: methods of construction, James Cooke Brown, Loglan Institute, University Microfilms, 1981
Loglan 3: speaking Loglan : programmed textbook on the phonology, basic vocabulary, and grammar of the simple Loglan sentence, James Cooke Brown, Lujoye Fuller Brown, Loglan Institute, University Microfilms, 1965
Loglan 4: a Loglan-English dictionary,	James Cooke Brown, Lujoye Fuller Brown, Loglan Institute, 1970
Loglan 5: an English-Loglan dictionary, James Cooke Brown, Lujoye Fuller Brown, Loglan Institute, University Microfilms, 1981
Loglan 4 & 5: a Loglan-English/English-Loglan dictionary, James Cooke Brown, Loglan Institute, 1975

References

Notes
Anderson, Evelyn. James Cooke Brown: A Multitalented Man.
a) He serves as a combat navigator in the Army Air Forces.
b) He received a doctorate in sociology, mathematical statistics and philosophy from the Univ. of Minnesota in 1952.
c) He published a novella ("The Emissary", under the by-line "Jim Brown") he wrote in Mexico City in "Astounding Science Fiction".
d) Shortly before his death he completed "From Job Markets to Labor Markets" in which he proposed a computer-moderated economic system dividing work among all who seek employment.
e) He was a guardian of civil rights and joined fellow educators in a 1963 protest of a restaurant's 'whites only' policy; the sit-in resulted in his arrest and jail time.
f) He vehemently opposed the Vietnam War.
g) Was one of the writers in the publication: Brown, J.C. and Greenhood, W. (1991). Paternity, jokes and song: A possible evolutionary scenario for the origin of language and mind. Journal of Social and Biological Structures.14(3), 255-309.

External links

1921 births
2000 deaths
20th-century American novelists
American male novelists
American sociologists
American science fiction writers
Constructed language creators
Board game designers
20th-century linguists
Linguists from the United States
Loglan
American male short story writers
20th-century American short story writers
20th-century American male writers